Artaxerxes  may refer to:

The throne name of several Achaemenid rulers of the 1st Persian Empire:
 Artaxerxes I of Persia (died 425 BC), Artaxerxes I Longimanus, r. 466–425 BC, son and successor of Xerxes I
 Artaxerxes II of Persia (436 BC–358 BC), Artaxerxes II Mnemon, r. 404–358 BC, son and successor of Darius II
 Artaxerxes III of Persia (425 BC–338 BC), Artaxerxes III Ochus, r. 358–338 BC, son and successor of Artaxerxes II
 Artaxerxes IV of Persia (died 336 BC), Artaxerxes IV Arses, r. 338–336 BC, son and successor of Artaxerxes III
 Artaxerxes V of Persia (died 329 BC), Artaxerxes V Bessus, r. 330–329 BC, nobleman who seized the throne from Darius III

Artaxerxes may also refer to:
 Ardeshir (disambiguation), the Middle and Modern Persian name descended from Old Persian equivalent of Artaxerxes, Artaxšacā
 Artaxerxes (opera), a 1762 opera by Thomas Arne
 7212 Artaxerxes, a main-belt asteroid
 The wizard Artaxerxes, a character in J.R.R. Tolkien's novella "Roverandom"

See also
 Asha
 Artaxias (disambiguation)
 Artaserse